The 1981 Vanderbilt Commodores football team represented Vanderbilt University in the 1981 NCAA Division I-A football season. The Commodores were led by head coach George MacIntyre in his third season and finished the season with a record of four wins and seven losses (4–7 overall, 1–5 in the SEC).

Schedule

Personnel

References

Vanderbilt
Vanderbilt Commodores football seasons
Vanderbilt Commodores football